Darrell Gerald May (born March 6, 1962) is a Canadian former professional ice hockey player.

Early life 
He was born in Montreal, Quebec. As a youth, he played in the 1974 and 1975 Quebec International Pee-Wee Hockey Tournaments with a minor ice hockey team from Pointe-Claire. He moved to St. Albert, Alberta after the age of 13, and also resided there after retirement.

Career
May played six games in the National Hockey League with the St. Louis Blues. He was selected by the Vancouver Canucks in the fifth round (91st overall) of the 1980 NHL Entry Draft. Most of his playing career was with the Peoria Rivermen of the IHL.

References

External links

1962 births
Living people
Anglophone Quebec people
Canadian ice hockey goaltenders
Chicago Blackhawks scouts
St. Louis Blues players
Ice hockey people from Montreal
Vancouver Canucks draft picks